William Quinn Buckner (born August 20, 1954) is an American former professional basketball player and coach.  He played collegiate basketball for the Indiana University Hoosiers, and won a national championship in 1976. He was a captain of both the last undefeated NCAA Division I basketball champion and the 1976 Olympics gold medal team. Buckner was selected by the Milwaukee Bucks with the 7th pick of the 1976 NBA draft.  He had a ten-year NBA career for three teams (the Bucks, the Boston Celtics, and the Indiana Pacers).  In 1984, he won an NBA title with the Celtics.

Buckner is one of only eight players in history to win an NCAA championship, an NBA championship, and an Olympic gold medal. He is one of only three players in history to win a High School state championship, NCAA championship, an NBA championship, and an Olympic gold medal. He also was a State Champion while playing high school basketball in Illinois.

In addition to his playing career, Buckner was the head coach of the Dallas Mavericks for one year, from 1993 to 1994.  Currently, Buckner is a color analyst for the Indiana Pacers television broadcast team on Bally Sports Indiana. Buckner also was the play-by-play announcer on 989 Sports line of college basketball games for several years.

Early life
Born in 1954 in Phoenix, Illinois, Buckner played basketball at Thornridge High School in Dolton, Illinois. His Falcons lost only one game during his junior and senior seasons and won back-to-back state titles.  The 1972 team was undefeated, with no team coming within 14 points of it, and is often cited as the greatest team in the history of Illinois high school basketball. Buckner was also an excellent football player, making all-state in high school. He is the only person ever named Chicago area Player of the Year for both football and basketball.

In 2006, Buckner was voted as one of the 100 Legends of the IHSA Boys Basketball Tournament, a group of former players and coaches in honor of the 100 anniversary of the IHSA boys basketball tournament.

College career
Buckner elected to play college basketball for the Indiana University Hoosiers under Coach Bob Knight. He ended his college career as a four-year starter and three-year captain at Indiana, and also played football for one year. He seemed to get along with volatile Coach Knight better than any other player in the Hoosiers' history. "The one thing that I learned early was to respect authority figures, right or wrong", Buckner told the Dallas Morning News concerning his relationship with Knight.

In Buckner's freshman season, 1972–73, Indiana reached the Final Four, losing to UCLA. He played for the United States men's national basketball team in the 1974 FIBA World Championship, winning the bronze medal. In two consecutive seasons, 1974–75 and 1975–76, the Hoosiers were undefeated in the regular season and won 37-consecutive Big Ten games. The 1974–75 Hoosiers swept the entire Big Ten by an average of 22.8 points per game. However, in an 83–82 win against Purdue they lost consensus All-American forward Scott May to a broken left arm. With May's injury keeping him to 7 minutes of play, the No. 1 Hoosiers lost to Kentucky 92–90 in the Mideast Regional. Buckner, along with three of his teammates, would make the five-man All-Big Ten team.

The following season, 1975–76, Buckner served as a co-captain and the Hoosiers went the entire season and 1976 NCAA tournament without a single loss, beating Michigan 86–68 in the title game. Indiana remains the last school to accomplish this feat.

NBA career
In Buckner's 10-year NBA career he was a tough defender, a solid playmaker, and a stabilizing force in any lineup. At various stages he filled the role of team leader and trusty reserve.

Although he scored only 10.0 points per game during his college career, Buckner was selected by the Milwaukee Bucks in the first round of the 1976 NBA draft, the seventh pick overall. He was also selected by the Washington Redskins in the 1976 NFL Draft. (Buckner had played free safety on the Hoosiers’ football team for two years.)

Before he joined the Bucks, Buckner played on the gold medal-winning 1976 U.S. Olympic basketball team alongside Adrian Dantley, Mitch Kupchak, and Scott May. But nothing could have prepared him for the NBA experience. Buckner's teams had suffered only 25 defeats in his eight years of high school and college basketball, and he had never been on a team that lost more than seven games in a season. But Milwaukee lost 52 times in 1976–77, finishing last in the Midwest Division.

Individually, Buckner proved to be a competent NBA player. He was unspectacular offensively, averaging 8.6 points while shooting .434 from the field, but he excelled on defense, ranking fourth in the league with 2.43 steals per game.

The next year Buckner raised his scoring slightly, to 9.3 points per game, and was named to the NBA All-Defensive Second Team. That postseason, Buckner set a playoffs career-high with 19 points alongside recording 10 assists in a Game 7 loss against the Denver Nuggets in the conference semifinals (the Bucks were in the Western Conference at the time). After a similar season in 1978–79, Buckner had his three best years. In 1979–80 he averaged 10.7 points and 5.7 assists, made the NBA All-Defensive Second Team for the second time, and helped the Bucks to the Midwest Division title. Under Coach Don Nelson, Milwaukee had assembled a solid lineup that included forward Marques Johnson, center Bob Lanier, and guards Brian Winters, Sidney Moncrief, and Junior Bridgeman.

The 1980–81 campaign saw Buckner play in all 82 games and notch career highs in scoring (13.3 ppg), field-goal percentage (.493), free-throw percentage (.734), and steals (197, third in the league). He repeated on the NBA All-Defensive Second Team. The Bucks were outstanding, finishing 60–22 with a balanced offense that saw seven players average in double figures. Milwaukee had high hopes for the postseason, but Julius Erving's Philadelphia 76ers derailed the Bucks in the Eastern Conference Semifinals.

Buckner had established a reputation as a solid, dependable player with good fundamentals. He was never going to be a flashy player or a big scorer; his low-trajectory shot was jokingly said to have been responsible for more bent rims than Darryl Dawkins's dunks.

"My strength is defense," he said in the Boston Globe. "Another is my overall knowledge of the game and being able to get everybody involved in the game. I’ve never had an illusion that shooting is one of my strengths. In fact, it was a very known weakness that I had.…You play with a lot of pride and work hard every night out."

Milwaukee was trying to add a few essential parts that would turn the team into a championship contender, and the bottleneck at guard made Buckner expendable.

Before the 1982–83 season he was traded to the Boston Celtics for center Dave Cowens. When Boston signed Buckner, Red Auerbach told the Boston Globe, "He's a winner, a leader. He rises to the occasion. He has a good personality, he's team oriented, and he's disciplined." Buckner added, "I’ve always admired the Boston style of play, and I feel I can play it."

Milwaukee never did win the title. Boston, however, won a championship in 1984, with Buckner coming off the bench to spell Dennis Johnson and Gerald Henderson. The Celtics went 62–20 during the regular season and then nudged the Los Angeles Lakers in a seven-game NBA Finals. With the NBA championship ring, Buckner completed an impressive résumé.

In three seasons with Boston, Buckner made small but regular contributions for a powerful Celtics team. The club returned to the Finals in 1985, but the Lakers exacted their revenge, winning in six games.

Following the season, Boston traded Buckner to the Indiana Pacers for guard Jerry Sichting. He opened the 1985–86 season with the Pacers but was waived after 32 games, and subsequently retired, ending his 10-year career.

NBA career statistics

Regular season

|-
| style="text-align:left" | 1976–77
| style="text-align:left" | Milwaukee
| 79 || – || 26.5 || .434 || – || .539 || 3.3 || 4.7 || 2.4 || 0.3 || 8.6
|-
| style="text-align:left" | 1977–78
| style="text-align:left" | Milwaukee
| 82 || – || 25.3 || .468 || – || .645 || 3.0 || 5.6 || 2.3 || 0.2 || 9.3
|-
| style="text-align:left" | 1978–79
| style="text-align:left" | Milwaukee
| 81 || – || 21.7 || .454 || – || .632 || 2.6 || 5.8 || 1.9 || 0.2 || 7.2
|-
| style="text-align:left" | 1979–80
| style="text-align:left" | Milwaukee
| 67 || – || 25.2 || .467 || .400 || .734 || 3.6 || 5.7 || 2.0 || 0.1 || 10.7
|-
| style="text-align:left" | 1980–81
| style="text-align:left" | Milwaukee
| 82 || – || 29.1 || .493 || .167 || .734 || 3.6 || 4.7 || 2.4 || 0.0 || 13.3
|-
| style="text-align:left" | 1981–82
| style="text-align:left" | Milwaukee
| 70 || 70 || 30.8 || .482 || .267 || .655 || 3.6 || 4.7 || 2.5 || 0.0 || 12.9
|-
| style="text-align:left" | 1982–83
| style="text-align:left" | Boston
| 72 || 56 || 21.7 || .442 || .000 || .632 || 2.6 || 3.8 || 1.5 || 0.1 || 7.9
|-
| style="text-align:left" | 1983–84
| style="text-align:left" | Boston
| 79 || 0 || 15.8 || .427 || .000 || .649 || 1.7 || 2.7 || 1.1 || 0.0 || 4.1
|-
| style="text-align:left" | 1984–85
| style="text-align:left" | Boston
| 75 || 6 || 11.4 || .383 || .000 || .640 || 1.2 || 2.0 || 0.8 || 0.0 || 2.4
|-
| style="text-align:left" | 1985–86
| style="text-align:left" | Indiana
| 32 || 3 || 13.1 || .471 || .000 || .704 || 1.6 || 2.7 || 1.3 || 0.1 || 3.7
|- class="sortbottom"
| style="text-align:center;" colspan="2"| Career
| 719 || 135 || 22.6 || .461 || .184 || .657 || 2.7 || 4.3 || 1.9 || 0.1 || 8.2
|}

Playoffs

|-
| style="text-align:left" | 1977–78
| style="text-align:left" | Milwaukee
| 9 || – || 28.6 || .500 || – || .652 || 3.0 || 6.9 || 2.0 || 0.1 || 11.2
|-
| style="text-align:left" | 1979–80
| style="text-align:left" | Milwaukee
| 7 || – || 23.6 || .340 || .000 || .636 || 2.3 || 4.4 || 2.1 || 0.0 || 6.1
|-
| style="text-align:left" | 1980–81
| style="text-align:left" | Milwaukee
| 7 || – || 26.1 || .433 || .000 || .688 || 2.9 || 5.0 || 1.6 || 0.0 || 9.0
|-
| style="text-align:left" | 1982–83
| style="text-align:left" | Boston
| 7 || – || 14.0 || .432 || .000 || .000 || 1.4 || 0.3 || 0.1 || 0.0 || 4.6
|-
| style="text-align:left" | 1983–84
| style="text-align:left" | Boston
| 23 || – || 11.7 || .405 || .000 || .545 || 1.5 || 1.2 || 0.6 || 0.0 || 3.3
|-
| style="text-align:left" | 1984–85
| style="text-align:left" | Boston
| 15 || 0 || 5.7 || .591 || .000 || .625 || 0.5 || 0.8 || 0.4 || 0.0 || 2.1
|- class="sortbottom"
| style="text-align:center;" colspan="2"| Career
| 68 || 0 || 15.5 || .439 || .000 || .610 || 1.7 || 2.5 || 0.9 || 0.0 || 5.1
|}

Broadcasting career
He later on became a broadcaster for ESPN and NBC. He also called college and NBA basketball for CBS Sports and called games for the Minnesota Timberwolves in the early 1990s with Kevin Harlan, as well as games for the Cleveland Cavaliers.

Buckner now calls Indianapolis his home and is the color commentator for Indiana Pacers television broadcasts (on Fox Sports Indiana from 1999 to 2021 and Bally Sports Indiana since 2021). Buckner participates in community relations efforts and contributes to Pacers TipOff, a game preview newsletter distributed via e-mail for every home Pacers game.

Coaching career
He was named head coach of the Dallas Mavericks for 1993–94. The club had gone 11–71 the previous season, and the franchise was in disarray. Although Buckner had no NBA coaching experience, Mavericks owner Don Carter hoped Buckner's charismatic personality and lifelong knack for winning would rub off on the young team. In an interview with the Arizona Republic, Buckner repeated his success formula: "Dedication, commitment, extreme concentration, discipline, realizing it can’t be done alone, it has to be done through the team."

Believing that his young charges needed more discipline, Buckner determined from the start to be a stern taskmaster in Knight's mold. Knight had advised Buckner that he would only be able to win in the NBA if he ran his team with an iron hand.  The plan backfired, with many of the players (including Jamal Mashburn) complaining publicly about Buckner's heavy-handed coaching style. NBA historian Peter Bjarkman even suggested that Buckner frequently consulted with Knight during the season.  They started 1–23, and for a while it looked like they would break the 1972–73 Philadelphia 76ers' record for the most losses in a season.  Buckner loosened the reins a little bit as the season wore on, but it was not enough to keep the team from finishing 13–69—by far the worst record in the league, and at the time the worst record ever for a rookie coach who managed to survive for a full season (surpassed by Bill Hanzlik with the 1997–98 Denver Nuggets).

Buckner also angered Carter and other executives by not consulting them on hiring assistant coaches; they only learned about those hires when they called and asked how much they would get for moving expenses. Although Buckner had a five-year contract, Carter decided that "too many bridges had been burned" and fired him after the season.

In July 2004, Buckner was named the Vice President of Communications for Pacers Sports & Entertainment (PS&E), which owns and operates the Indiana Pacers, the WNBA's Indiana Fever and the Pacers Foundation, Inc.  Buckner was appointed to serve a 3-year term on the Indiana University Board of Trustees by then-Indiana governor Mike Pence in June 2016.

Head coaching record

|-
|style="text-align:left"|Dallas
|style="text-align:left"|
| 82 || 13 || 69 ||  ||style="text-align:center"|6th in Midwest || – || – || – || 
|style="text-align:center"|Missed Playoffs
|- class="sortbottom"
|style="text-align:left"|Career
| || 82 || 13 || 69 ||  ||style="text-align:center"| || – || – || – ||  ||

Personal life
Buckner has four children with his wife Rhonda; Jason, Cory, Lauren and Alexsandra.

He is a member of Alpha Phi Alpha fraternity.

See also
 List of National Basketball Association single-game steals leaders

References

External links
 Indiana Pacers: Quinn Buckner, Cable TV Color Analyst
 BasketballReference.com: Quinn Buckner (as coach)
 BasketballReference.com: Quinn Buckner (as player)

1954 births
Living people
1974 FIBA World Championship players
20th-century African-American sportspeople
21st-century African-American people
African-American basketball players
All-American college men's basketball players
American men's basketball players
Basketball coaches from Illinois
Basketball players at the 1976 Summer Olympics
Basketball players from Illinois
Boston Celtics players
College basketball announcers in the United States
Dallas Mavericks head coaches
Indiana Hoosiers football players
Indiana Hoosiers men's basketball players
Indiana Pacers announcers
Indiana Pacers players
Medalists at the 1976 Summer Olympics
Milwaukee Bucks draft picks
Milwaukee Bucks players
Minnesota Timberwolves announcers
Olympic gold medalists for the United States in basketball
Parade High School All-Americans (boys' basketball)
Point guards
Sportspeople from Cook County, Illinois
United States men's national basketball team players